Ricky Meinhold (born March 8, 1986) is an American former baseball pitcher who is currently the pitching coach for the Missouri Tigers. Meinhold previously served for the St. Louis Cardinals of Major League Baseball (MLB), the New York Mets of Major League Baseball (MLB), and the Lotte Giants of the Korea Baseball Organization (KBO).

Early life
Meinhold was born in St. Louis, Missouri. He attended Westmont High School in Campbell, California, and Georgia College & State University in Milledgeville, Georgia. Meinhold attended West Valley College in Saratoga, California from 2004 to 2006 earning an Associate of Arts in Liberal Arts and Sciences, General Studies and Humanities. From 2006 to 2008, Meinhold attended Drury University in Springfield, Missouri earning an Bachelor of Arts in Kinesiology and Exercise Science. He graduated in 2008.

Playing career
While attending Drury University he played for both the Drury Panthers baseball team and the basketball team.

Not being drafted coming out of college by a major league team, Meinhold was signed by the Gateway Grizzlies of the independent Frontier League on April 29, 2009, however, he would be released on May 17, 2009, having never played for the team. Meinhold began his playing career with the Windy City ThunderBolts after being signed on July 23, 2009. He posted a 4–3 record with a 3.35 ERA and 44 strikeouts in 11 games. His 2010 contract exercise was picked up by the Thunderbolts on December 3, 2009, and was signed to an extension on April 8, 2010. The 2010 season with the Thunderbolts proved poorly for Meinhold as he compiled an 0–2 record and a 5.56 ERA in 16 games. On July 15, 2010, Meinhold was traded to the Grizzlies, and the following day he was signed to a contract extension. His 2010 season with the Grizzlies was a poorer effort as he posted a 1–2 record with an 8.19 ERA. His contract option was picked up by the Grizzlies for the 2011 season but would be released on December 10, 2010, ending his playing career in the United States.

Meinhold moved to Australia and played for the South Australian team for the 2010 Claxton Shield regular season.

Coaching career

Coker College
Following his playing career, Meinhold was hired as the pitching coach, recruiting coordinator, and assistant athletic director of administration at Coker College from July 2011 to December 2013, while he was earning his Master of Science in Sports Administration. He graduated in 2013.

St. Louis Cardinals
In 2013, Meinhold was hired as a scout and as a coach for the St. Louis Cardinals minor-league affiliate Palm Beach Cardinals. After the 2014 season he was promoted to being a professional major league scout. From 2017 to 2019, he served as the pitching development analyst.

During his time with the Cardinals since April 2016, he also serves at USA Baseball for pitching development and evaluation. A position he still holds since leaving the Cardinals organization. He would later serve as the pitching coach for the 2017 United States national under-18 baseball team.

New York Mets
In December 2019, Meinhold was hired by then-GM Brodie Van Wagenen as the minor league pitching coordinator for the New York Mets.

In January 2021, Meinhold was promoted by the Mets as the club's assistant pitching coach serving alongside Jeremy Hefner while retaining the minor league pitching coordinator position.

On September 23, 2021, Meinhold left his position as the assistant pitching coach and minor league pitching coordinator.

Lotte Giants
On November 6, 2021, Meinhold was hired as the director of pitching for the Lotte Giants of the Korea Baseball Organization.

University of Missouri

In the late summer of 2022, Missouri Tigers hired Meinhold as their pitching coach taking over after the passing of former Seattle Mariners bullpen coach/Director of Pitching, Brian DeLunas. Meinhold, as Assistant Major League Pitching Coach and Pitching Coordinator, hired DeLunas as Special Projects Coordinator with the New York Mets working together during the 2020–2021 season.

References

External links

 Twitter
 LinkedIn

1986 births
Living people
Baseball players from St. Louis
Basketball players from St. Louis
Georgia College & State University alumni
Drury Panthers baseball players
Drury Panthers men's basketball players
Coker University people
Coker University alumni
West Valley College alumni
Windy City ThunderBolts players
Gateway Grizzlies players
Minor league baseball coaches
Major League Baseball pitching coaches
St. Louis Cardinals scouts
New York Mets coaches